Janéa Noel Holmquist Newbry (born December 14, 1974) is an American politician of the Republican Party. She was a member of the Washington State Senate, representing the 13th Legislative District from 2007 to 2015. She previously served in the Washington House of Representatives from 2001 to 2006.

Background

Holmquist Newbry was first elected to the Senate in 2006, after serving 3 terms as the 13th District's State Representative. At 31, she became the youngest female State 
Senator in Washington history.

She was the chairwoman on the Washington State Senate Commerce and Labor Committee, and also serves on the Trade and Economic Development Committee.

She served on the State Building Codes Council, the Joint Legislative Audit & Review Committee, and the Select Committee on Pension Policy.

Congressional campaign
On February 19, 2014, Holmquist Newbry announced that she would run for Congress in Washington's 4th Congressional District following 10-term Congressman Doc Hastings' announcement that he would not be seeking reelection in 2014.

Awards
 2014 Guardians of Small Business award. Presented by NFIB.
Washington Restaurant Association Legislative Hero Award
Association of Washington Business Jim Mattson Award
Washington State Potato Commission Legislator of the Year
Association of General Contractors Legislator of the Year
Association of General Contractors Legislator of the Year
Business Institute of Washington's Business Star Award.
She is also the only legislator to earn the Washington Farm Bureau Legislator of the Year Award two years in a row.

Education

Holmquist Newbry earned her B.A. in Political Science and Sociology from Gonzaga University in Spokane, WA.

Personal

Holmquist Newbry resides in Grant County with her husband, Matt.  In 2012 they had a son, Makaio. In early 2013, when Janea left the Senate chambers to nurse her newborn son, Democrats tried to seize the opportunity for a quick vote without her since the Republicans only had a one-vote majority at the time. The effort failed.

References

1974 births
Living people
Republican Party members of the Washington House of Representatives
Republican Party Washington (state) state senators
Women state legislators in Washington (state)
Gonzaga University alumni
People from Kittitas County, Washington
21st-century American women